The 2019 season was the Dallas Cowboys' 60th in the National Football League (NFL), their 11th playing home games at AT&T Stadium and their ninth and final season under head coach Jason Garrett. It also marked the return of tight end Jason Witten, who retired in 2018 and spent a year as the color analyst for Monday Night Football. Wide receiver Cole Beasley, who was the second-longest tenured player on the roster, left the team in the offseason and signed with the Bills.

Despite being 6–4 by Week 11 and leading the NFC East, the Cowboys suffered a late-season collapse, losing four of the last six games for a final record of 8-8. The Cowboys failed to improve on their 10–6 record from the previous season after a 26–15 loss to the Buffalo Bills on Thanksgiving. A week later, they became unable to tie that record with a 31–24 loss to the Chicago Bears. A Week 16 loss to the Philadelphia Eagles was the turning point of their season, as they squandered a chance to become the first team in the NFC East to defend its division title since the Eagles did so from 2001 to 2004. The Eagles proceeded to win in Week 17 against the Giants, ensuring Philadelphia would be the 2019 NFC East champions, as well as ending the Cowboys' season.

Head coach Jason Garrett's contract was not renewed by Jerry Jones after expiration.

Offseason

Signings

Re-signings

Trade acquisitions

Departures

NFL Draft

Notes
The Cowboys traded their 2019 first-round draft pick to the Raiders in exchange for WR Amari Cooper.
The Cowboys traded a conditional 2019 sixth-round draft pick in September 2017 to the Bengals in exchange for CB Bene Benwikere.
As a result of a negative differential of free agent signings and departures that the Cowboys experienced during the  free agency period, the team received one compensatory selection in the fourth round of the 2019 NFL draft.

Staff

Rosters

Opening preseason roster

Week one roster

Final roster

Preseason

On March 21, the exhibition matchup between the Cowboys and the Los Angeles Rams was officially announced for Saturday, August 17, at Aloha Stadium just outside of Honolulu, Hawaii, with the Rams serving as the home team.

Regular season

Schedule
The Cowboys' 2019 schedule was announced on April 17.

Note: Intra-division opponents are in bold text.

Game summaries

Week 1: vs. New York Giants

In the season opener, the Cowboys scored in 5 consecutive drives, the longest streak in Cowboys history, despite Evan Engram scoring a touchdown first in this game. After that, it was all Dallas the rest of the way. The win allowed the Cowboys to start 1-0.

Rookie quarterback Daniel Jones would end up playing the remainder of the game for Eli Manning when Manning was removed from the game due to a coaching decision made by head coach Pat Shurmur. This would be Manning's last game he played against the Cowboys, as he did not play in their second game in MetLife Stadium due to Jones being the starter since week 3 of the season.

Week 2: at Washington Redskins

The game started with Montae Nicholson obtaining an interception, which would allow the Redskins to score the next drive. The Cowboys responded with a touchdown pass to Devin Smith to tie the game at 7-7. They would claim the lead, via a touchdown pass to veteran tight end Jason Witten before halftime. The Redskins would respond back after another touchdown scored by the Cowboys. Ezekiel Elliott would run for a first down to clinch the game, allowing the Cowboys to run out the clock. The game ended with Dak Prescott and Elliott rushing for 180 combined yards. This win would improve the Cowboys to 2-0.

Week 3: vs. Miami Dolphins

As historic Vegas favorites (22 points), both Ezekiel Elliott and Tony Pollard obtained 100+ rushing yards in one game. The game started with a missed field goal from the Dolphins. The Cowboys also denied the Dolphins a touchdown when DeMarcus Lawrence recovered a fumble at the Dallas 7-yard line. After this, it was all Dallas the rest of the way. This win improved the Cowboys to 3-0.

Week 4: at New Orleans Saints

The game would be neck-to-neck all the way. Chidobe Awuzie and the Cowboys recorded their first interception of the season. Despite a strong defense and allowing no touchdowns, they would drop to 3-1 with the loss. This game practically mimicked the previous year's game between these two teams in Dallas where it was mainly a defensive battle.

Week 5: vs. Green Bay Packers

In a highly anticipated matchup against Aaron Rodgers and the Green Bay Packers in a testament of the Cowboys-Packers rivalry, the Cowboys struggled mightily. Looking to defeat the Packers whom they have not beaten at home since 2007, the first drive resulted in an interception, which the Packers returned the interception for 37 yards without scoring. The Cowboys recovered from a 28 point deficit, but the Packers would prove excessive to overcome, and for the first time since the Divisional Round from 2018, they would allow 30+ points. This loss dropped the Cowboys to 3-2.

Week 6: at New York Jets

The Cowboys traveled to Metlife Stadium to take on Sam Darnold, who had just recovered from mono and the Jets in one of their two trips to East Rutherford, New Jersey. They looked to defeat the Jets, whom they have not beaten since 2007.

The Jets would score a 92-yard touchdown in one of the worst defensive plays by the Cowboys. The Cowboys attempted to rally, but while attempting a two-point conversion that would tie the game and send it to overtime, the pass was incomplete. The loss dropped them to 3-3, and their streak of losing three games against the Jets continued.

Week 7: vs. Philadelphia Eagles

The Cowboys dominated the entire game and returned to their winning ways. One of the first plays was a forced fumble on Carson Wentz, which Dallas recovered. Tavon Austin would give the Cowboys the first scoring drive shortly afterwards. Brett Maher kicked a 63-yard field goal to break his old record of 62, which was also during a game at home against the Eagles. The Cowboys would put their 3-game losing streak to an end as the Cowboys would improve to 4-3.

Week 9: at New York Giants

Despite a first pass attempt being an interception and the Giants having a lead by 9 points, the Cowboys dominated the rest of the game. Ezekiel Elliott made his first appearance at MetLife Stadium since his rookie season and would run for 139 yards on 23 carries. The game is famous for a black cat appearing during the game. This would delay the game for several minutes. The Jourdan Lewis fumble recovery sealed the game as it was returned for a touchdown while the Cowboys led 30-18 to put them up 37-18 and improve to 5-3 with the win.

Week 10: vs. Minnesota Vikings

The contest was competitive the entire night. The Cowboys would start by falling behind after two touchdowns were scored by the Vikings. Later, the Cowboys fought back and grabbed the lead late. This wouldn't last long as the Vikings ran away with another touchdown scoring drive. The Cowboys responded with a field goal to make it 28–24. Luck ran out after Dak Prescott's Hail Mary pass was intercepted in the fading seconds, sealing the Cowboys' loss. This loss dropped the Cowboys to 5-4.

Week 11: at Detroit Lions

On the first handoff to Ezekiel Elliott, the fumble was recovered by the Lions, that way the Lions could score and take a 7-0 lead. The Cowboys would respond with a field goal by Brett Maher. Later on, the Cowboys would claim the lead and would not allow the Lions to lead again after Cowboys scored another touchdown. The game's biggest highlight was a catch by Michael Gallup, who would scoop the ball up after nearly dropping a pass. This win would improve them to 6-4.

Elliott's touchdown celebration of the “Dak Dance” became a meme and a trend for the rest of the 2019 NFL season.

Week 12: at New England Patriots

The Cowboys were held to three field goals the entire game. One of the lowlights included a blocked Chris Jones punt. The Patriots would score a touchdown the next drive. Despite a strong showing from the defense, the Cowboys would never lead. The Cowboys dropped to 6–5.

Week 13: vs. Buffalo Bills
Thanksgiving Day Games

Coming off a close loss at New England, the Cowboys returned home to take on the Bills. The Cowboys would obtain the lead 7-0 when Dak Prescott threw a touchdown pass to Jason Witten. Afterwards, the Cowboys would struggle in nearly every other aspect as they would not respond again until the 4th quarter. Their second touchdown was not enough as the Bills would defeat the Cowboys, 26-15. This loss would not only drop the Cowboys to 6-6, but also raised concerns of whether or not if the team were still contenders. This loss also ensures they would no longer exceed the win mark from the previous season.

Week 14: at Chicago Bears

The game would begin with the Cowboys leading 7-0, but they would struggle the remainder of the game. Bears' Mitchell Trubisky lead the Bears to a heavy 31-14 lead. The Cowboys would later fight back, but only to score 10 points. This loss dropped them to 6-7 and below .500 for the first time this season. Also with the loss, they would no longer be able to tie their 10-6 record from the previous season.

Week 15: vs. Los Angeles Rams

Before the game started, there was an error on a coin toss, which the officials misunderstood, which Dak Prescott actually said "kick" when he intended to say "defer". The Cowboys afterwards dominated and led the entire game. It was the first time since the Week 13 in 2018 that the Cowboys would defeat a team sitting with a minimum of .500 percentage of wins. The win by the Cowboys also improved them to 7-7.

Week 16: at Philadelphia Eagles

The Cowboys were denied a chance to become the first NFC East team to repeat as division champions since the Eagles did so between 2001 and 2004.

The game began with the Eagles converting two third-downs and converting a 36-yard field goal. The Cowboys would allow the Eagles' offense to march down the field 63 yards over 7 plays. Dallas Goedert caught a 6-yard pass from Wentz to increase the Eagles' lead. The Cowboys drove to the Eagles' 23-yard line when they were trailing 17-9, in which the Cowboys attempted to tie the game. A pass to Michael Gallup was incomplete on a fourth down play, giving the ball back to the Eagles to run out the game clock. This loss dropped the Cowboys to 7-8.

Week 17: vs. Washington Redskins

Kai Forbath remained perfect in field goals as he converted each attempt for the third consecutive game. Jaylon Smith obtained his first interception in his career off quarterback Case Keenum, who started as emergency for Dwayne Haskins Jr. who injured his ankle the previous week. This would be the final game with head coach Jason Garrett as his contract expired and was not renewed. This win would prevent the Cowboys from suffering their first losing season since 2015 to finish 8-8. However, the Cowboys would be eliminated from playoff contention thanks to the Eagles' 34-17 victory over the Giants.

Standings

Division

Conference

References

External links
 
 

Dallas
Dallas Cowboys seasons
Dallas Cowboys
2010s in Dallas
2019 in Texas